Springville is a census-designated place (CDP) in Tulare County, California, United States.  The population was 934 at the 2010 census, down from 1,109 at the 2000 census.

Geography
Springville is located at  (36.128378, -118.819001).

Climate
This region experiences warm and dry summers, during which the temperature can reach up to 100 F.  According to the Köppen Climate Classification system, Springville has a warm-summer Mediterranean climate, abbreviated "Csb" on climate maps. Csb = Warm-summer Mediterranean climate; coldest month averaging above 0 °C (32 °F) (or −3 °C (27 °F)), all months with average temperatures below 22 °C (71.6 °F), and at least four months averaging above 10 °C (50 °F). At least three times as much precipitation in the wettest month of winter as in the driest month of summer, and driest month of summer receives less than 30 mm (1.2 in).

Demographics

2010
At the 2010 census Springville had a population of 934. The racial makeup of Springville was 836 (89.5%) White, 5 (0.5%) African American, 20 (2.1%) Native American, 7 (0.7%) Asian, 0 (0.0%) Pacific Islander, 25 (2.7%) from other races, and 41 (4.4%) from two or more races. Hispanic or Latino of any race were 109 people (11.7%).

The whole population lived in households, no one lived in non-institutionalized group quarters and no one was institutionalized.

There were 427 households, 96 (22.5%) had children under the age of 18 living in them, 181 (42.4%) were opposite-sex married couples living together, 39 (9.1%) had a female householder with no husband present, 21 (4.9%) had a male householder with no wife present.  There were 17 (4.0%) unmarried opposite-sex partnerships, and 4 (0.9%) same-sex married couples or partnerships. 156 households (36.5%) were one person and 53 (12.4%) had someone living alone who was 65 or older. The average household size was 2.19.  There were 241 families (56.4% of households); the average family size was 2.85.

The age distribution was 173 people (18.5%) under the age of 18, 62 people (6.6%) aged 18 to 24, 161 people (17.2%) aged 25 to 44, 343 people (36.7%) aged 45 to 64, and 195 people (20.9%) who were 65 or older.  The median age was 50.3 years. For every 100 females, there were 95.0 males.  For every 100 females age 18 and over, there were 87.4 males.

There were 516 housing units at an average density of 122.9 per square mile, of the occupied units 264 (61.8%) were owner-occupied and 163 (38.2%) were rented. The homeowner vacancy rate was 3.3%; the rental vacancy rate was 15.1%.  581 people (62.2% of the population) lived in owner-occupied housing units and 353 people (37.8%) lived in rental housing units.

2000
At the 2000 census there were 1,109 people, 544 households, and 283 families in the CDP. The racial makeup of the CDP was 94.14% White, 0.09% African American, 0.54% Native American, 0.27% Asian, 1.80% from other races, and 3.16% from two or more races. Hispanic or Latino of any race were 5.59%.

Of the 544 households 22.2% had children under the age of 18 living with them, 38.6% were married couples living together, 10.3% had a female householder with no husband present, and 47.8% were non-families. 41.9% of households were one person and 22.2% were one person aged 65 or older.  The average household size was 2.04 and the average family size was 2.80.

The age distribution was 21.6% under the age of 18, 3.6% from 18 to 24, 22.8% from 25 to 44, 28.6% from 45 to 64, and 23.4% 65 or older.  The median age was 46 years. For every 100 females, there were 90.2 males.  For every 100 females age 18 and over, there were 83.3 males.

The median household income was $24,271 and the median family income  was $35,000. Males had a median income of $34,375 versus $31,406 for females. The per capita income for the CDP was $19,695.  About 21.6% of families and 25.7% of the population were below the poverty line, including 42.5% of those under age 18 and 10.7% of those age 65 or over.

Politics
In the state legislature Springville is located in the 16th Senate District, represented by Republican Shannon Grove, and in the 26th Assembly District, represented by Republican Devon Mathis.

In the United States House of Representatives, Springville is in

Natural history 
The rare wildflower Clarkia springvillensis was discovered near and named after Springville in 1964.

Fictional references 
In the science fiction novel Lucifer's Hammer, written by Larry Niven and Jerry Pournelle, fragments of a comet strike the Earth, causing massive tidal waves to destroy most of the planet's coastal cities.  Los Angeles is completely destroyed, and the collapse of dams throughout California causes the San Joaquin Valley to become an inland sea.  The second half of this novel focuses on an enclave of civilization in the fictional "Silver Valley", located slightly east or northeast of Springville, and just north of the Middle Fork of the Tule River.

Several key scenes in Alfred Hitchcock's Saboteur (1942) take place at a ranch in Springville.

See also
Pier Fire

References

External links
Springville Chamber of Commerce

Census-designated places in Tulare County, California
Census-designated places in California